The Roman Catholic Diocese of Rondonópolis-Guiratinga is a diocese located in the city of Rondonópolis in the Ecclesiastical province of Cuiabá in Brazil.

History
 July 13, 1940: Established as Territorial Prelature of Chapada from the Metropolitan Archdiocese of Cuiabá
 November 25, 1961: Renamed as Territorial Prelature of Rondonópolis
 February 15, 1986: Promoted as Diocese of Rondonópolis
 June 25, 2014: Renamed as Diocese of Diocese of Rondonópolis-Guiratinga

Bishops

Ordinaries, in reverse chronological order
 Bishops of Rondonópolis (Roman rite)
 Bishop Juventino Kestering (1997.11.19 – 2021.03.28)
 Bishop Osório Willibaldo Stoffel, O.F.M. (1986.02.15 – 1997.11.19)
 Prelates of Rondonópolis (Roman Rite)
 Bishop Osório Willibaldo Stoffel, O.F.M. (1970.11.27 – 1986.02.15)
 Bishop Vunibaldo Godchard Talleur, O.F.M. (1961.11.25 – 1970)
 Prelates of Chapada (Roman Rite)
 Bishop Vunibaldo Godchard Talleur, O.F.M. (1947.12.20 – 1961.11.25)

Other priest of this diocese who became bishop
Giovane Pereira de Melo, appointed Bishop of Tocantinópolis, Tocantins in 2009

References
 GCatholic.org
 Catholic Hierarchy

Roman Catholic dioceses in Brazil
Christian organizations established in 1940
Rondonopolis, Roman Catholic Diocese of
Roman Catholic dioceses and prelatures established in the 20th century